Bor Artnak (born 4 June 2004) is a Slovenian tennis player.

Artnak has a career high ATP singles ranking of 672, achieved on 6 February 2023. On the junior tour, he has a career high ITF combined ranking of 10, achieved on 16 May 2022.

Artnak has won one ITF singles title.

Artnak represents Slovenia at the Davis Cup, where he has a W/L record of 2–1.

ATP Challenger and ITF World Tennis Tour finals

Singles: 2 (1–1)

References

External links

2004 births
Living people
Slovenian male tennis players